Burnt is a 2015 American drama film directed by John Wells and written by Steven Knight, from a story by Michael Kalesniko. The film stars an ensemble cast including Bradley Cooper, Sienna Miller, Omar Sy, Daniel Brühl, Matthew Rhys, Riccardo Scamarcio, Alicia Vikander, Uma Thurman and Emma Thompson. The film was released on October 30, 2015, by The Weinstein Company. The film was not well received by critics and grossed $36.6 million.

Plot
Adam Jones was the chef at a high-class Parisian restaurant owned by his mentor Jean-Luc, until his drug use and temperamental behavior destroyed his career and the restaurant. In the aftermath, Adam went into self-imposed exile in New Orleans by shucking a million oysters to sober up, planning to head to London to restart his career and attempt to earn a third Michelin star.

In London, Adam searches for old colleagues, beginning with his mentor's former maître d'hôtel, Tony Balerdi, now a hotel manager of The Langham Hotel in London, under the ownership of the Balerdi family. Adam checks into one of The Langham's rooms then visits an old friend, Conti, and notes the talent of his sous-chef Helene, but she dislikes his arrogance and dismisses him immediately. A Paris colleague, Michel, whose restaurant Adam had sabotaged out of jealousy, tracks him down. After a brief fistfight, they talk and Michel forgives Adam then asks to work for him. Adam also visits a cutting-edge eatery run by Reece, with whom he has a long-standing rivalry, and the visit ends poorly. Adam's former drug dealer realizes he has returned to Europe and attempts to collect Adam's outstanding debt.

Adam convinces famed restaurant critic Simone to dine at Tony's hotel. Tony realizes that Adam set this up and is reluctant to let him cook, but his kitchen is in such poor condition it would result in Simone shutting his restaurant down. Seeing no other way, he allows Adam to cook. Simone's favorable review convinces Tony to renovate the hotel's kitchen and hire Adam as head chef permanently. He stipulates that Adam must submit to weekly drug tests with Tony's psychiatrist Dr. Rosshilde. Adam agrees to the tests, although he is uninterested in therapy and throws himself into preparations for the grand opening. Another old friend, Max, joins Adam's team after being released from prison. Helene rebuffs further job offers until Conti fires her and sends her to Adam's kitchen. Helene is irate about being fired, but Adam convinces her to work for him by tripling her salary.

Opening night is a disaster, and Adam furiously closes early, blaming Helene. He publicly humiliates her, escalating from verbal to physical aggression, and she quits. Adam goes on a talk show that he previously turned down to drum up publicity for the restaurant. At his second opening, a restaurant critic gives a positive review, enraging Reece. Tony convinces Helene to return with a doubled salary and some insight about Adam's behavior. Adam improves his attitude, but refuses her request for time off for her daughter Lily's birthday. Later, he notices his kitchen acting in a strange manner. Helene reveals that her daughter is at the restaurant under Tony's supervision, since she did not want to spend her birthday at home. Adam is upset, but relents and bakes Lily a birthday cake, which impresses Helene.

With the restaurant's reputation established, Adam sets his sights on three Michelin stars, still avoiding his drug dealer, even after Tony offers to pay off his debt. Adam takes Helene to the reopening of Reece's restaurant. Adam and Reece are civil, but the night derails when Adam spots his ex-girlfriend Anne Marie, the daughter of Jean-Luc. Adam finds Anne Marie surprisingly forgiving after he abandoned her in Paris and missed her father's funeral. The encounter leaves Adam shaken and introspective about his failure in Paris. Early the next morning, Helene finds him at the fish market where they kiss in the alley behind The Langham on the way back to the restaurant. They are interrupted by the drug dealer's thugs, who take Adam away. He returns that night during dinner service beaten and bruised.

Kaitlin, the front of house host, advises Tony that two Michelin reviewers have arrived, and he cooks for them rather than going to the hospital. They send their meals back as it's too spicy, and Michel reveals he sabotaged the sauce with cayenne pepper as revenge for Adam's past cruelty before walking out. On the verge of a breakdown, Adam leaves the restaurant.

He wanders the city, eventually arriving at Reece's restaurant drunk. Once inside, he begins to break down emotionally. Reece soothes him, and they part on better terms the following morning. Adam attends a group therapy session, then returns to the hotel, where he learns that Anne Marie has paid off his debt. She gives him her father's knives and tells him that she approves of Helene. Tony and Helene find Adam and tell him that the two men they thought were Michelin reviewers were actually just businessmen on a trip. Adam rejoices at the opportunity of a second chance, Adam kisses Tony out of relief.

Altered by his experiences, Adam changes the way he runs the kitchen. As a result of his improved attitude and teamwork, the restaurant receives its third Michelin star. At the end, he sits down to eat the family meal with the kitchen crew, who are his new family.

Cast

 Bradley Cooper as Adam Jones
 Sienna Miller as Helene Sweeney
 Omar Sy as Michel
 Daniel Brühl as Tony Balerdi
 Riccardo Scamarcio as Max
 Sam Keeley as David
 Alicia Vikander as Anne Marie
 Matthew Rhys as Montgomery Reece 
 Uma Thurman as Simone
 Emma Thompson as Dr. Rosshilde
 Lily James as Sara
 Sarah Greene as Kaitlin
 Henry Goodman as Conti
 Stephen Campbell Moore as Jack
 Lexie Benbow-Hart as Lily
 Charlotte Hawkins as TV Presenter

Jamie Dornan played the part of Leon Sweeney but his scenes were deleted.

Production

Development
In 2013, John Wells was set to direct a cooking comedy film, then titled Chef, with Bradley Cooper signed to star as a former Paris chef, Adam Jones. Sienna Miller signed as lead actress. 

Omar Sy, Jamie Dornan, Emma Thompson, Daniel Brühl, Alicia Vikander and Lily James were also set to star in the film. Dornan's appearance was later removed due to cuts and adjustments in the storyline and Lily James's role revealed to be a cameo. Dornan's scenes were added to the home release. 

In July 2014, it was reported that the film's title had been changed from Chef to Adam Jones, to avoid confusion with Jon Favreau's film Chef. Uma Thurman joined the cast around this time. According to Deadline Hollywood, as of July 28, 2014, Weinstein was calling the film Untitled John Wells project, until they could decide on a better title. On August 7, 2014, Matthew Rhys was added to the cast, playing chef Jones' rival, Reece. In July 2015, it was announced that the film had been retitled Burnt. 

The film was executive produced by celebrity chef Gordon Ramsay.

Filming
Principal photography on the film began July 23, 2014, in New Orleans, Louisiana, filming for two days. Production then moved to London and West London Film Studios.

Post-production
On October 2, 2014, Nick Moore was hired for the film editing job. During editing of the film, Jamie Dornan's scenes were cut from the finished version.

Marketing
The first poster, with the new title Burnt, was released on August 7, 2015. Cooper introduced a sneak peek of the film on the Today show on August 10, 2015. The Weinstein Company released the teaser trailer on August 14, 2015. On September 21, 2015, the first international trailer was released. On September 28, 2015, producers released the first full-length trailer for the film and on October 29, 2015, released a clip featuring Vikander and Cooper online.

Release
The film was scheduled to be released on October 2, 2015, but in July 2015, The Weinstein Company moved the release date to October 23, 2015. The plan then was to give the film a limited release on October 23, 2015, before a wide release on October 30, 2015. However, they cancelled the limited release plan and immediately released the film nationwide, on October 30, 2015.

Reception

Box office
Burnt grossed $13.7 million in North America and $23.0 million in other territories, for a worldwide total of $36.6 million, against a budget of $20 million.

The film opened on October 30, 2015, alongside Our Brand Is Crisis and Scouts Guide to the Zombie Apocalypse. In its opening weekend, the film was projected to gross $7–9 million from 3,003 theaters. However, it only ended up grossing $5 million, finishing sixth at the box office, and marking the second straight underperforming opener for Cooper, following Aloha ($9.7 million opening against its $37 million budget).

Critical response
Burnt received negative reviews from critics, who praised Cooper's performance but derided the script and storytelling. On Rotten Tomatoes, the film holds a rating of 28%, based on 159 reviews, with an average rating of 4.90/10. The site's critical consensus reads, "Burnt offers a few spoonfuls of compelling culinary drama, but they're lost in a watery goulash dominated by an unsavory main character and overdone clichés." On Metacritic, the film has a score of 42 out of 100, based on 28 critics, indicating "mixed or average reviews". Audiences polled by CinemaScore gave the film an average grade of "B−" on an A+ to F scale.

Justin Chang of Variety praised Cooper's performance but was critical of the script: "Steven Knight’s script pours on the acid but holds the depth, forcing its fine actors (including Sienna Miller and Daniel Bruhl) to function less as an ensemble than as a motley sort of intervention group."

References

External links
 
 

2015 films
2015 LGBT-related films
American LGBT-related films
2010s English-language films
2010s French-language films
2015 comedy-drama films
American comedy-drama films
LGBT-related comedy-drama films
2015 multilingual films
Cooking films
Lesbian-related films
Films about food and drink
Films about chefs
Films directed by John Wells
Films scored by Rob Simonsen
Films set in London
Films set in Paris
Films set in restaurants
Films shot in London
Films shot in Paris
Films with screenplays by Steven Knight
3 Arts Entertainment films
The Weinstein Company films
American multilingual films
2010s American films